Charity's House, at 108 Montjoy St. in Falmouth, Kentucky, was listed on the National Register of Historic Places in 1983.

Deemed notable in black history, it was home of Charity Southgate, from whom most of black population in Falmouth descended.  She bought the lot in 1845 after gaining her freedom from slavery, and built this house soon after.  It was in the Happy Hollow neighborhood. She built several other houses on the block for her children and grandchildren.

The house no longer is on the site.

See also 
 Elzey Hughes House: Also in Happy Hallow
 National Register of Historic Places listings in Pendleton County, Kentucky

References

Houses completed in 1850
Houses in Pendleton County, Kentucky
Houses on the National Register of Historic Places in Kentucky
National Register of Historic Places in Pendleton County, Kentucky
1850 establishments in Kentucky
Former buildings and structures in Kentucky
African-American history of Kentucky
Falmouth, Kentucky